The enzyme heparin lyase catalyzes the following process:

 Eliminative cleavage of polysaccharides containing (1→4)-linked D-glucuronate or L-iduronate residues and (1→4)-α-linked 2-sulfoamino-2-deoxy-6-sulfo-D-glucose residues to give oligosaccharides with terminal 4-deoxy-α-D-gluc-4-enuronosyl groups at their non-reducing ends

This enzyme belongs to the family of lyases, specifically those carbon-oxygen lyases acting on polysaccharides.  The systematic name of this enzyme class is heparin lyase. Other names in common use include heparin eliminase, and heparinase.

References

 

EC 4.2.2
Enzymes of unknown structure